Whisky Run is a stream in Jefferson County, Nebraska, in the United States.

Whisky Run was so named because U.S. soldiers poured out a large quantity of seized whisky into its waters.

See also
List of rivers of Nebraska

References

Rivers of Jefferson County, Nebraska
Rivers of Nebraska